During the 2002–03 season, Hertha BSC competed in the Bundesliga.

Season summary
After two successive eliminations in the UEFA Cup third round, Hertha went one better by reaching the round of 16, before elimination by eventual semi-finalists Boavista in away goals. Qualification for the UEFA Cup for the fourth time in a row was obtained with a 5th-placed finish.

Players

First-team squad
Squad at end of season

Left club during season

References

Notes

Hertha BSC seasons
Hertha BSC